On 22 December 2015, a light aircraft of the Indian Border Security Force crashed within the grounds of Indira Gandhi International Airport in Delhi, India. Ten personnel of the Border Security Force, three officers and seven senior technicians, were killed. The 22-year-old Beechcraft B200 King Air took off for Ranchi just before 9.30am, before crashing shortly afterwards.

Accident 
After the King Air's engines were started the crew reported that there was a problem (the nature of which has not been reported), but continued with the flight after advice from ground staff. The aircraft took off at 9:27am local time, with an expected arrival time at Ranchi of 12:00pm.

Soon after taking off, the crew informed air traffic control that something was wrong and that they would return the aircraft to Delhi. The crew were then cleared to make an emergency landing on Delhi's Runway 28. At 9:40am contact was lost with the aircraft. The King Air veered to the left, narrowly missing a village. It brushed a tree before hitting the perimeter wall of the airport, it then crashed into a sewage treatment plant within the airport complex. The aircraft then caught fire and was almost completely destroyed. All ten occupants were killed; one person on the ground was injured.

References

External links 
 

Indian Border Security Force King Air crash
Aviation accidents and incidents in India
Indian Border Security Force King Air crash
Indian Border Security Force King Air crash, 2015i
Accidents and incidents involving the Beechcraft Super King Air
Indian Border Security Force King Air crash